The following highways are numbered 716:

Canada

Costa Rica
 National Route 716

United States